Pukatawagan Airport  is located  east of Pukatawagan, Manitoba, Canada.

Airlines and destinations
In addition to offering a daily service to The Pas/Grace Lake Airport (CJR3), Missinippi Airways offers charters and Medivac flights.

Accidents

See also
Pukatawagen Water Aerodrome

References

External links

Certified airports in Manitoba

Transport in Northern Manitoba